Cuisine of Berlin describes different aspects of Berlin's culinary offerings. On the one hand, it means the traditional Berlin cuisine of Berlin households with dishes from the German cuisine. On the other hand, often a rustic pub and snack kitchen, which has become increasingly international due to many migration waves since 1945 and 1990. After 2000, numerous top-class restaurants have evolved in Berlin.

History

Until the end of the 19th century, the Berlin kitchen was a simple kitchen, which emphasized hearty taste and saturation rather than refinement. In the 17th century, numerous Huguenots settled in Berlin and brought their cooking traditions with them. The Prussian-Protestant kitchen integrated these influences essentially through simplification.

Typical ingredients were pork, goose and fish such as carp, eel and pike, cabbage, legumes such as peas, lentils and beans as well as beets, cucumbers and potatoes. What is striking – from today's perspective – is the frequent use of the noble crayfish, which made it possible to catch fish rich in Berlin in the 18th and 19th centuries.

With the founding of the German Empire, Berlin became the capital of a world empire and the arrival from different provinces expanded the city's cooking tradition, and Berlin cuisine began to internationalize. Jewish and Eastern European types of preparation were added, which expanded the menu in the capital.

In the 1920s, Berlin was one of the largest cities in the world. Numerous large hotels and restaurants offered different dishes. The Nazi regime and the Second World War of annihilation that followed put an end to this culinary diversity. While in the eastern part, as the de facto capital of the GDR, the upscale gastronomy almost completely disappeared and international influences did not appear for decades, the restaurant scene in the west recovered slowly from this break.

The first restaurants for fine cuisine opened in the rebuilt City West after the war. During the division of Berlin, the delicatessen department of KaDeWe remained one of the largest of its kind in the world and is still very popular with city residents and tourists alike.

The Berlin currywurst is said to have been invented in 1949 by Herta Heuwer from Königsberg, who was running a small snack stand in Charlottenburg at the time.

In 1958, the Café Kranzler opened on Kurfürstendamm, which wanted to follow the pre-war coffeehouse culture. The café established itself in the following years as a West Berlin institution.

Due to the labour migration after the Second World War, the Berlin kitchen internationalized again. Turkish immigrants are said to have invented the doner kebab in Kreuzberg in the 1970s, which is now considered one of the most typical Berlin snacks.

Since reunification in 1990 at the latest, Berlin has been able to establish itself again as a metropolis for gourmets. Even in the former eastern part such as Mitte or Prenzlauer Berg, there are now numerous restaurants with international offerings.

Mealtimes 

Breakfast is often consisting of bread rolls with either jam or cold meats and cheese, accompanied by coffee, tea or juice. The midday meal was traditionally the main meal of the day, but in modern times as Berliners work longer hours further from home this is no longer the case. The main meal is now often taken in the evening.

Dishes

Meat dishes

 "Liver Berlin style" – Fried veal liver with onions and apple slices on mashed potatoes
Currywurst
Kassler – Salted and smoked roast pork
Roast goose – Traditional Christmas dinner in many Berlin households
Königsberger Klopse – Meatballs with anchovies and caper sauce
Döner Kebab
 Buletten

Fish dishes

 Rollmops – Pickled herring filets 
 "Polish carp" – Carp in gingerbread sauce
 Hecht mit Butterkartoffeln
 "Aal Grün" - Eel in herb sauce

Vegetable dishes and side dishes

 Kartoffelpuffer – potato pancake, often found at Christmas markets, sweet with apple sauce and sugar or hearty with salmon and cream horseradish
  with quark and linseed oil
  – a cultivar of turnip (Brassica rapa var. teltowiensis) braised in butter and caramelized sugar; served as a side dish
 Sauerkraut
 Bratkartoffeln – served as a side dish or main course with fried egg
 Asparagus with Hollandaise sauce
  - a type of lentil stew

Sweets

Dessert
 "Berliner Luft" – ("Air of Berlin") White wine cream with raspberry sauce
 "Mohnpielen" – Bread pudding with poppy seeds
 "Rote Grütze" – Red fruit stewed fruit usually served with vanilla sauce

Bakery products
 The "Berliner" or Berliner Pfannkuchen 
 Berliner Napfkuchen – Yeast cake with raisins
 Berliner Käsekuchen – Cheese cake made from curd cheese mass with raisins and rum on a short pastry base
 "Liebesknochen" (" Love Bone") – German word for Eclair
 Pflaumenkuchen mit Streuseln
 Splitterbrötchen

Beverages 
Berlin has a long brewing tradition. The most common variety is Pilsener. Brands such as Schultheiss,  and Berliner Pilsener are common. The wheat beer Berliner Weisse is drunk in summer as a Berliner Weiße mit Schuss with raspberry or woodruff syrup.

Markets and shops 
German bakeries offering a variety of breads and pastries are widespread. Europe's largest delicatessen market is found at the KaDeWe. 34,000 specialty and gourmet foods and beverages are stored there. Among the world's largest chocolate stores is Fassbender & Rausch.

Restaurants and bars 
Berlin is home to a diverse gastronomy reflecting the immigrant history of the city. Turkish, Arab, Vietnamese and many European immigrants brought their culinary traditions to the city. The modern fast-food version of the doner kebab sandwich which evolved in Berlin in the 1970s, has since become a favorite dish in Berlin elsewhere in the world.  It is estimated, that more than 1,000 döner restaurants exist in Berlin alone. German pubs, Chinese, Thai, Indian, Korean, and Japanese restaurants, as well as Spanish tapas bars, Italian, and Greek cuisine, can be found in many parts of the city.

In 2017, there were a total of seven restaurants that were awarded two Michelin stars. Another 14 restaurants received a star. In 2017, Berlin was the city with the most star restaurants in German-speaking countries. Berlin is well known for its offerings of vegetarian and vegan cuisine and is home to an innovativefood scene promoting cosmopolitan flavors, local and sustainable ingredients, pop-up street food markets, supper clubs, as well as food festivals, such as Berlin Food Week.

Holidays 
On the Christmas Days following Christmas Eve, roasted goose is a staple of Christmas Day meals. The advent season is often associated with sweet and spicy foods like Weihnachts- or Christstollen and Lebkuchen. The Easter season, for instance, is typically associated with chocolate Easter eggs and Easter Bunnies. The preceding carnival season and New Years Eve is known for Pfannkuchen.

Companies and brands 
 August Storck: Toffifee, Knoppers, Werther's Original
 Bio Company
 HelloFresh
 Delivery Hero
 Brauerei Lemke
 Veganz

See also 
 German cuisine

References